Anna Foglietta (born 3 April 1979) is an Italian actress. She has appeared in the films Escort in Love and Ex – Amici come prima!. She has also appeared in several television series such as Distretto di Polizia and The Mafia Kills Only in Summer.

Biography
Foglietta was born and raised in Rome from a family of Neapolitan origins. She won the Nastro d'Argento for Best Actress, with Un giorno all'improvviso.

Selected filmography

References

External links

Living people
Italian film actresses
Italian television actresses
1979 births
Actresses from Rome
Nastro d'Argento winners
People of Campanian descent
21st-century Italian actresses